The Marriage of the Bear (aka The Bear's Wedding) is a 1925 Soviet silent horror-fantasy drama film directed by Konstantin Eggert and Vladimir Gardin. It is based on the play with the same name by Anatoli Lunacharsky, which in turn was based on Prosper Mérimée's novella Lokis (Lithuanian for "bear").

Prosper Mérimée wrote many short stories of which Lokis is one. He was also the author of La Venus d'Ille which Italian horror director Mario Bava adapted to film in 1978. The Russian silent film with its lycanthropic theme predates Universal's later werewolf films, such as The Werewolf of London (1935) and The Wolf Man (1941). But with prints of this film almost impossible to view (although it is said to still exist in a couple of archives), it's difficult to determine if the "man-into-beast" scenes of the film refers to a literal shapeshifter, or if it's just a psychological condition that affects the main character's mind. Despite this claim by critic Troy Howarth that the film is possibly lost there is clear evidence the film screened on television in Russia during the vhs era and a recording of one such broadcast is in circulation. Critic Troy Howarth calls it "possibly the first depiction of a man-into-beast scenario (in a horror film)". However, as stated by film critic Kat Ellinger, who has seen the film, no such transition occurs. The Count’s potential status as a lycanthrope is suggested through surreal dream sequences and third party story telling. The film’s climax where the bride is killed, is shown only in the aftermath and it is ambiguous as to whether the Count was in bear form
when he murdered her. This interpretation is in line with the original Merimee text, which is also ambiguous. 

Merimee’s novella has two other adaptations on film that are known so far: 1971 as Lokis by Polish director Janusz Majewski, and again in 1975 as The Beast by Polish auteur Walerian Borowczyk.

Plot
When a pregnant Russian countess is frightened by a bear, she later gives birth to a male child who acts in some ways like an animal. As the boys matures, he takes to stalking young women in the forest while wearing the skin of a bear. When he becomes an adult, the boy marries a young girl and appears to be normal. But on their honeymoon, he turns into a bear and murders his wife, drinking her blood. But it's not clear whether the transformation is real, or if the young man just believes he is a bear and is acting like one.

Cast
 Konstantin Eggert 
 Vera Malinovskaya as Yulka 
 B. Afonin 
 Varvara Alyokhina as Old Adelina  
 Alexander Geirot 
 Aleksandra Kartseva as Adelina Shemet  
 Galina Kravchenko 
 Olga Lenskaya 
  
 M. Rozenstein 
 N. Stal 
 Nikolai Vitovtov 
 Vladimir Vladislavskiy 
 Ye. Volkonskaya 
 Yuri Zavadsky as Olgert

References

Bibliography 
 Liz-Anne Bawden. The Oxford companion to film. Oxford University Press, 1976.

External links 
 

1925 films
1925 drama films
1925 horror films
1920s fantasy films
Soviet silent feature films
Soviet drama films
Soviet fantasy films
1920s Russian-language films
Films based on works by Prosper Mérimée
Films directed by Vladimir Gardin
Films directed by Konstantin Eggert
Soviet black-and-white films
Soviet horror films
Silent drama films
Silent horror films